Radiation effect is the physical and chemical property changes of materials induced by radiation.

Examples
Bleaching of linen
Formation of latent image in photography
Embrittlement of optically transparent polymers such as lucite.

See also
Radiation sensitivity
Radiation Effects and Defects in Solids (journal)

References

External links